Zodarion abantense is a spider species found in Turkey, Georgia and Russia.

See also
 List of Zodariidae species

References

External links

abantense
Spiders of Europe
Spiders of Georgia (country)
Spiders of Russia
Arthropods of Turkey
Spiders described in 1980